Ryan Carty (born August 9, 1983) is an American college football coach. He is the head football coach at the University of Delaware, a position he had held since the 2022 season.

Playing career
Raised in Somerville, New Jersey, Carty played high school football at Somerville High School.

Carty played as a quarterback at Delaware from 2002 to 2006. He was a backup quarterback for the entirety of his career, including when Delaware won the NCAA Division I-AA national championship in 2003. He was named a team captain in his senior season and was projected to be the Blue Hens' starting quarterback, but lost the position to transfer and future Super Bowl MVP Joe Flacco.

Coaching career

New Hampshire
Carty began his coaching career at New Hampshire as the program's tight ends coach, one of the final hires made by offensive coordinator Chip Kelly before he departed for Oregon. He also spent two years each coaching running backs and wide receivers at New Hampshire before he was promoted to offensive coordinator in 2012.

Sam Houston State
Carty was hired as the offensive coordinator at Sam Houston State in 2018, reuniting him with his college coach K. C. Keeler. He was named FootballScoop's FCS coordinator of the year in 2020, after Sam Houston State won its first NCAA Division I FCS national championship.

Delaware
Carty was named head football coach of the University of Delaware on December 10, 2021.

Personal life
Carty's father, Kevin Sr., was a coach at the high school and college levels, and Carty's brothers. Kevin Jr. and Sean, were also high school football coaches.

Head coaching record

References

External links
 
 Delaware coach profile
 Sam Houston State profile
 Delaware player profile

1983 births
Living people
American football quarterbacks
Delaware Fightin' Blue Hens football coaches
Delaware Fightin' Blue Hens football players
New Hampshire Wildcats football coaches
Sam Houston Bearkats football coaches
Somerville High School (New Jersey) alumni
People from Branchburg, New Jersey
Sportspeople from Somerville, New Jersey
Players of American football from New Jersey
Coaches of American football from New Jersey